Travis Preston (born September 20, 1959) is an American director and theater artist. He is the Artistic Director of the CalArts Center for New Performance and Dean of the CalArts School of Theater. His notable works include Prometheus Bound, The Master Builder, Brewsie and Willie, Macbeth and King Lear.

Background
Preston was born in September 1959 in East Chicago, Indiana. He applied for Yale School of Drama while working on his Ph.D. in psychology Indiana University.

Career
In 2017, Preston directed Fantômas: Revenge of the Image and staged it at the Wuzhen Theatre Festival in China. He also directed and produced Sam Shepard's Buried Child for the Hong Kong Repertory Theatre.

In 2013, Preston revisited Aeschylus' Prometheus Bound, staging it at the Getty Villa at the Barbara and Lawrence Fleischman outdoor Amphitheater. The performance featured Emmy award winner Ron Cephas Jones in the role of Prometheus, and Mirjana Joković as Io. For the play, he and set designer Efren Delgadillo Jr, employed a 23-foot-tall rotating steel wheel symbolizing time and representing the protagonist being bound to a mountaintop, as per the Greek tragedy.

Preston was appointed as the Artistic Director of the CalArts Center for New Performance in 2005 and Dean of the CalArts School of Theater in August 2010. In the same year, he directed Ibsen's The Master Builder at the Almeida Theatre in London, starring Gemma Arterton and Stephen Dillane.

In 2005, Preston directed Stephen Dillane in the popular Shakespeare tragedy Macbeth (A Modern Ecstasy). In the play, he explored the inner landscape of Macbeth's soul and staged this one performer drama in a minimalist set at REDCAT in Disney Hall. The play was also performed at the Almeida Theater in London and at the Sydney and Adelaide Festivals in Australia.

Preston has been teaching faculty at universities and theater training programs including The Yale School of Drama, Columbia School of the Arts, New York University, the National Theater School of Denmark, Indiana University, Hong Kong Academy for the Performing Arts, and Harvard University.

Devised work
Preston began applying his work on classic texts and text-based methods to devising projects derived from various sources in rehearsal. Using the physical/gestural techniques he developed as a basis, Preston devised a wide ranging series of works that expanded the discourse and practice of contemporary performance creation. These included Paradise Bound: Part II, a spectacle with 100 performers mounted at the Central Park bandshell in New York that involved a chorus of boom boxes “conducted” in an urban ritual of radio cacophony; Woyzeck/Nosferatu (Samuel Beckett Theater, NYC), a meditation on silent cinema and
hypnosis; Apocrypha at Cucaracha in New York in 1995, an oratorio based on the Gnostic Gospels: Democracy in America, based on Alexis de Tocqueville's work of the same name, created together with Colette Brooks for the Yale Repertory Theatre.

Opera
As part of Copenhagen's activities as Cultural City of Europe, Travis Preston directed Lulu by
Alban Berg - a co-operation between the Danish National Symphony, the Lille Grønnegåde Theater,
and the Royal Family of Denmark, performed in the Queen's riding stables of Christiansborg
Palace. This began a series of opera works: Luigi Nono's Al gran sole carico d'amore and Boris
Godounov at the Hamburg State Opera, Don Pasquale, Falstaff, Don Giovanni, Semiramide, The Pearl Fishers, and Saul and the Witch of Endor at Opera at the Academy in New York. He directed the opening performance gala at Daniel Libeskind's Jewish Museum in Berlin.

Recognition  
In 2006, Preston was awarded Chevalier of the Order of Arts and Letters by the French Minister of Culture.

References 

Living people
1957 births
American theatre directors